Ânderson Lima Veiga (born March 18, 1973 in Brazil), or simply Ânderson Lima, is a Brazilian football midfielder. He is well known as being a free-kick specialist in Brazil.

Club statistics

Honours 
Brazil
 South American Under-17 Championship: 1988
 South American Under-20 Championship: 1991

Santos
 Torneio Rio-São Paulo: 1997
 Copa Conmebol: 1998

Grêmio
 Copa do Brasil: 2001
 Campeonato Gaúcho: 2001

São Caetano
 Campeonato Paulista: 2004

Coritiba
 Campeonato Brasileiro Série B: 2007

References

External links

1973 births
Living people
Brazilian footballers
Brazilian expatriate footballers
Expatriate footballers in Japan
Campeonato Brasileiro Série A players
Campeonato Brasileiro Série B players
J1 League players
Clube Atlético Juventus players
Guarani FC players
Santos FC players
São Paulo FC players
Grêmio Foot-Ball Porto Alegrense players
Associação Desportiva São Caetano players
Albirex Niigata players
Coritiba Foot Ball Club players
Operário Futebol Clube (MS) players
Clube Atlético Bragantino players
Associação Chapecoense de Futebol players
Brazil youth international footballers
Association football midfielders
Footballers from São Paulo